Thomas Henry Casanova III (born July 29, 1950) is a former American football player and politician. He played professionally in the National Football League (NFL) for the Cincinnati Bengals for six seasons and was invited to three Pro Bowls, as well as an All-Pro in 1976. He played college football at Louisiana State University, where he was a three-time first-team All-American. He is a Republican former member of the Louisiana State Senate, having served a single term from 1996 to 2000.

Early life and college 
Casanova attended the Roman Catholic Notre Dame High School in Crowley, Louisiana. As a senior at Notre Dame, he was chosen to play in the Louisiana High School Coaches Association all-star game.

After high school, Casanova attended Louisiana State University in Baton Rouge, where he played for the LSU Tigers football team. He was a running back, kick returner, and defensive back for the Tigers. As a freshman in 1968, he led the Bayou Bengals in rushing with 209 yards on 54 attempts. He also returned punts and kickoffs, and was a defensive standout.

In 1969, Casanova's first year on the varsity, he was shifted to cornerback. LSU fielded four defensive All-Americans in linebackers George Bevan and Mike Anderson, defensive tackle Ron Estay, and Casanova. Casanova was recognized as a first-team All-American by Football News. The Tigers lost only one game that year, to arch-rival Ole Miss.

As a junior in 1970, Casanova was a consensus All-American. He earned first-team honors from the Associated Press (AP) and American Football Coaches Association (AFCA), and second-team honors from United Press International (UPI) and the Central Press. In a 61–17 rout of Ole Miss in the final game of the regular season, Casanova had punt return touchdowns of 61 and 73 yards, tying the NCAA record for punt return touchdowns in a game.

Prior to his senior year in 1971, Casanova was featured on the front cover of the September 13, 1971 issue of Sports Illustrated, with the headline, "Tommy Casanova of LSU, Best Player in the Nation." In the second game of the season, against Texas A&M, Casanova pulled his right hamstring muscle and subsequently missed the next five games. He recorded his only interception of the year later that season in a nationally televised 28–8 victory over No. 7 Notre Dame. Despite missing nearly half the season due to injury, Casanova was again a consensus All-American, earning first-team recognition from the Football Writers Association of America and UPI. After his college career, Casanova played in the 1972 Chicago College All-Star Game against the Dallas Cowboys. His defensive play was lauded in the All-Stars' 20–7 loss.

Casanova was inducted into the College Football Hall of Fame in 1995. In 2000, the Walter Camp Football Foundation selected Casanova for their All-Century team, honoring the best college football players of the 20th century. His jersey number 37 was retired by LSU football on October 10, 2009. NFL and collegiate coach Pete Carroll has stated that Casanova was one of his all-time favorite players.

NFL
Casanova was drafted in the second of round of the 1972 NFL Draft with the 29th overall pick by the Cincinnati Bengals. After the draft, he received an offer from the Ottawa Rough Riders of the Canadian Football League, which he considered but he ultimately declined, and signed with the Bengals. Casanova played as a safety with the Bengals and also returned punts. As a rookie, he intercepted five passes on defense and had a 66-yard punt return for a touchdown. He was named the team MVP by his teammates after the season. In 1973, he had four interceptions, including two against the Pittsburgh Steelers in the seventh game of the season. He also had an interception in the Bengals' 34–16 divisional playoff loss to the Miami Dolphins.

Casanova was invited to his first Pro Bowl after the 1974 season. In 1975, Casanova moved from free safety to strong safety. His most productive year on defense was in 1976; he intercepted five passes and returned two of them for touchdowns and also returned a recovered fumble for a touchdown. He was invited to his second Pro Bowl and was recognized as a first-team All-Pro by the Associated Press. He had another Pro Bowl appearance in 1977 and retired after that season. Casanova compiled 17 interceptions in his career with the Bengals and scored three touchdowns on defense and one on a punt return.

Later life and politics
While playing for the Bengals, Casanova began to pursue his M.D. at the University of Cincinnati College of Medicine. In 1977, he quit playing football early to pursue his medical degree full-time. He graduated from the UC College of Medicine in 1980, and then began a three-year residency in ophthalmology in New Orleans. After completing his residency in 1983, Casanova went on to complete a specialization in oculoplastic surgery at the University of Utah in Salt Lake City.

In the 1995 nonpartisan blanket primary in the historically Democratic District 26, formerly District 24, the Republican Casanova upset veteran Democrat state Senator Armand Brinkhaus. Casanova received 21,543 votes (58 percent) to Brinkhaus's 15,753 (42 percent). In addition to Acadia and St. Landry, the district included parts of five other parishes: Avoyelles, Calcasieu, Cameron, Jefferson Davis, and Lafayette. During his term Casanova served alongside another physician, Donald E. Hines, who subsequently was the state Senate President from 2004 to 2008. After a single term, Casanova declined to seek reelection and returned to his ophthalmology practice in Crowley. He was succeeded by the Democrat Fred Hoyt.

See also
 Colin Allred - former NFL linebacker who became a lawyer and US Representative
 Dennis Claridge – former NFL quarterback who became an orthodontist
 Dan Doornink – former NFL running back who became a medical doctor
 Laurent Duvernay-Tardif – current NFL player who earned a medical degree while playing in the league
 John Frank - Super Bowl winning SF 49er who became a NY City based plastic surgeon
 Joel Makovicka – former NFL fullback who became a doctor of physical therapy
 Bill McColl - former NFL player who became an orthopedic surgeon, father of Milt McColl
 Milt McColl - former NFL linebacker who became a medical doctor
 Frank Ryan – former NFL player and mathematician, who maintained an academic career while playing in the league
 Myron Rolle – former NFL defensive back who was also a Rhodes scholar and is now serving a neurosurgery residency
 John Urschel – former NFL player and mathematician who was a PhD candidate while playing in the league
 Byron White - former NFL running back who became a US Supreme Court Justice
 Rob Zatechka – former NFL guard who became a medical doctor

References

External links
 
 

1950 births
Living people
American athlete-politicians
American football defensive backs
Cincinnati Bengals players
Republican Party Louisiana state senators
American ophthalmologists
LSU Tigers football players
University of Cincinnati College of Medicine alumni
All-American college football players
American Conference Pro Bowl players
College Football Hall of Fame inductees
University of Utah School of Medicine alumni
People from Crowley, Louisiana
Physicians from Louisiana
Players of American football from New Orleans